İsmail Akçay (born in 1942) is a Turkish athlete.
He was born in Akçakaya village of Balıkesir Province. After finishing primary school in his village, he studied in the industrial vocational high school of Balıkesir. Then he transferred to sergents' school in Ankara where he was interested in athletics. He specialized in marathon events.

Career
His international degrees are as follows:

His degree in  1968 Summer Olympics in Mexico city is so far the best result Turkey has in Olympic marathon events.

Presently
Presently İsmail Akçay serves as an athletic trainer in Balıkesir.

References

1942 births
Sportspeople from Balıkesir
Turkish male marathon runners
Olympic athletes of Turkey
Athletes (track and field) at the 1968 Summer Olympics
Athletes (track and field) at the 1972 Summer Olympics
Living people
Mediterranean Games silver medalists for Turkey
Mediterranean Games medalists in athletics
Athletes (track and field) at the 1967 Mediterranean Games
Athletes (track and field) at the 1971 Mediterranean Games